Bryan Robert Avery MBE RIBA (2 January 1944 – 4 July 2017) was an English architect, born in Wallingford, Berkshire. After his childhood years spent in Lymington in the New Forest, Hampshire, he studied architecture at Leicester College of Art (now the De Montfort University), followed by an MA in the History and Theory of Architecture at Essex University under Professors Joseph Rykwert and Dalibor Vesely.

He established his own practice Avery Associates Architects in 1976. The practice has built a wide range of projects ranging from theatres and museums to offices and educational buildings, many of which have won respected awards.

He published a book, Fragments of Wilderness City in 2011 which describes his work and theory.

Awards
Avery was awarded the MBE in the Queen's Birthday Honours in June 2015 for services to architecture.

In 2010 Avery was awarded the Chicago Athenaeum International Architecture Award for the Old Bailey office building.

In 1999, Avery was awarded the Design Council's Millennium Products Award for the BFI IMAX cinema in Waterloo, London.

Projects (built)
Museum of the Moving Image, London (1988)
Neathouse Place offices, London (1997)
Royal Academy of Dramatic Art (RADA), London
BFI London IMAX, London (1999)
The London Transport Museum, London (2007)
10 Old Bailey offices, London (2009)
Repton School Theatre, Derbyshire (2011)

Projects (proposals)
Oxford Street (1983)
Symbol for Southampton (2006)
Lymington residential, restaurant and gallery development (2011)
Wilderness City
CitizenM hotel, Holborn (2012)
Stansted Airport Crossrail (2013)
St Barbe Museum & Art Gallery, Lymington (2014)
No. 1 Undershaft (site of Aviva Tower), City of London (2015)

References

External links

1944 births
2017 deaths
Architects from Berkshire
Modernist architects
High-tech architecture
Alumni of the University of Essex
Alumni of De Montfort University